Hesperocorixa is a genus of water boatmen in the family Corixidae. There are more than 20 described species in Hesperocorixa.

Species
These 29 species belong to the genus Hesperocorixa:

 Hesperocorixa algirica (Puton, 1890)
 Hesperocorixa atopodonta (Hungerford, 1927)
 Hesperocorixa bertrandi Poisson, 1957
 Hesperocorixa brasiliensis
 Hesperocorixa brimleyi (Kirkaldy, 1908)
 Hesperocorixa castanea (Thomson, 1869)
 Hesperocorixa escheri (Heer, 1853)
 Hesperocorixa furtiva (Horváth, 1907)
 Hesperocorixa georgiensis (Egbert, 1946)
 Hesperocorixa harrisi (Uhler, 1878)
 Hesperocorixa interrupta (Say, 1825)
 Hesperocorixa kennicotti (Uhler, 1897)
 Hesperocorixa laevigata (Uhler, 1893)
 Hesperocorixa linnaei (Fieber, 1848)
 Hesperocorixa lobata (Hungerford, 1925)
 Hesperocorixa lucida (Abbott, 1916)
 Hesperocorixa luteola Nieser, 1979
 Hesperocorixa martini (Hungerford, 1928)
 Hesperocorixa michiganensis (Hungerford, 1926)
 Hesperocorixa minor (Abbott, 1913)
 Hesperocorixa minorella (Hungerford, 1926)
 Hesperocorixa moesta (Fieber, 1848)
 Hesperocorixa nitida (Fieber, 1851)
 Hesperocorixa obliqua (Hungerford, 1925)
 Hesperocorixa parallela (Fieber, 1860)
 Hesperocorixa sahlbergi (Fieber, 1848)
 Hesperocorixa scabricula (Walley, 1936)
 Hesperocorixa semilucida (Walley, 1930)
 Hesperocorixa vulgaris (Hungerford, 1925)

References

Further reading

External links

 

Articles created by Qbugbot
Corixini
Heteroptera genera